Marmilla is a natural region of southern-central Sardinia, Italy.
Etymology The name "Marmilla" comes from the vast rounded hills, probably resembling udders (see Marmilla castle in Las Plassas). Another hypothesis is that according to which given the presence of many marshes in the area, the landscape could appear dotted with "a thousand seas".
Tourism in the Marmilla can rely on various factors ranging from environmental assets, to the numerous Nuragic centers in the area, to architectural works. In particular, we note:

Environmental assets:
Giara of Gesturi
Monte Arci Natural Park
Nuragic centers:
Nuragic village of Su Nuraxi in Barumini,
Nuraghe Cuccurada in Mogoro,
Archaeological Area Nuraghe Sa Fogaia in Siddi
Tomb of the Giants "Sa Domu e s'Orcu" in Siddi
Genna Maria complex in Villanovaforru,
Su Mulinu Fortress in Villanovafranca,
Nuragic sanctuary of Santa Vittoria in Serri.

Architectural works

Romanesque churches of San Michele Arcangelo in Siddi, San Pietro in Villamar and San Giovanni Battista in Barumini
Gothic parish churches of San Vito di Gergei, Santa Barbara in Genoni and Beata Vergine Immacolata in Barumini,
Judicial castle of Las Plassas,
Sixteenth century house Zapata di Barumini
Portals of the historic houses of Simala
Church with Romanesque features San Biagio (Santu Brai) di Furtei
Museums:

"Sa Corona Arrubuia" Museum in Lunamatrona
Ornithological Museum in Siddi
Obsidian Museum in Pau
Monte Arci Geomuseum in Masullas
Museum "The Knights of the Hills" in Masullas
"Turcus and Morus" Museum in Gonnostramatza
MudA Museum in Las Plassas
Common

It is delimited from east and south by the Campidano, from north-west by Monte Arci, from north by the Giara di Gesturi and the Giara di Serri, and from east by the Flumini Mannu.

Geologically, most of Marmilla dates to the Miocene period, and is thus substantially younger than the rest of Sardinia. The landscape is mostly hilly, and human economical activities in the area include agriculture (prevalently cereals and  fava beans) and tourism.

Marmilla was inhabited since prehistoric times, as testified by the presence of nuraghe. To the Carthaginian domination date the fortress of Genoni. During the Middle Ages it was part of the Giudicato of Arborea and of the Giudicato of Cagliari.

Geography of Sardinia